In mathematics, particularly measure theory, the essential range, or the set of essential values, of a function is intuitively the 'non-negligible' range of the function: It does not change between two functions that are equal almost everywhere. One way of thinking of the essential range of a function is the set on which the range of the function is 'concentrated'.

Formal definition
Let  be a measure space, and let  be a topological space.

Equivalently, where  is the pushforward measure onto  of  under  and  denotes the support of

Essential values
We sometimes use the phrase "essential value of " to mean an element of the essential range of

Special cases of common interest

Y = C
Say  is  equipped with its usual topology. Then the essential range of f is given by

In other words: The essential range of a complex-valued function is the set of all complex numbers z such that the inverse image of each ε-neighbourhood of z under f has positive measure.

(Y,T) is discrete
Say  is discrete, i.e.,  is the power set of  i.e., the discrete topology on  Then the essential range of f is the set of values y in Y with strictly positive -measure:

Properties

 The essential range of a measurable function, being the support of a measure, is always closed.
 The essential image cannot be used to distinguish functions that are almost everywhere equal: If  holds -almost everywhere, then .
.
 The essential range satisfies .
 The essential supremum of a real valued function equals the supremum of its essential image and the essential infimum equals the infimum of its essential range. Consequently, a function is essentially bounded if and only if its essential range is bounded.
 The essential range of an essentially bounded function f is equal to the spectrum  where f is considered as an element of the C*-algebra .

Examples 

 If  is the zero measure, then the essential image of all measurable functions is empty.
 This also illustrates that even though the essential range of a function is a subset of the closure of the range of that function, equality of the two sets need not hold.
 If  is open,  continuous and  the Lebesgue measure, then  holds. This holds more generally for all Borel measures that assign non-zero measure to every non-empty open set.

Extension 

See also

 Essential supremum and essential infimum
 measure
 Lp space

References

 

Real analysis
Measure theory